Richmond Road may refer to:

 Richmond Road, a continuation of Greenhill Road, Adelaide, South Australia
 Richmond Road, a historic road name still used as the name for a segment of U.S. Route 25 in Lexington, Kentucky and between the cities of Lexington and Richmond (see Roads in Lexington, Kentucky)
 Richmond Road, Sydney
Richmond Road (Ohio), now State Route 175
 Richmond Road (Ontario)
 Richmond Avenue, Staten Island, New York City
 Richmond Road (Staten Island), another major road in the borough of Staten Island
 Richmond Road, Williamsburg, Virginia (Virginia Route 60) 
 Richmond Road Halt railway station, a closed railway station in Devon, England

See also
 Richmond Highway (disambiguation)
 Richmond Parkway (disambiguation)